Chloroselas pseudozeritis, the brilliant gem, is a butterfly of the family Lycaenidae. It is found in southern Africa.

The wingspan is 20–24 mm for males and females. Adults are on wing year-round with peaks from September to November and from March to May.

The larvae feed on Acacia species and Julbernardia globiflora. The larvae are known to live in tunnels in twigs of Julbernardia globiflora.

References
Chloroselas pseudozeritis pseudezeritis (Eastern Cape, KwaZulu-Natal, Transvaal, Botswana, Zimbabwe, Mozambique, Zambia, Malawi)
Chloroselas pseudozeritis tytleri Riley, 1932 (Tanzania, eastern Kenya, Ethiopia)
Chloroselas pseudozeritis umbrosa Jackson, 1966 (western Kenya, possibly Uganda)

Notes

Butterflies described in 1873
Chloroselas
Butterflies of Africa
Taxa named by Roland Trimen